The Doctor of Arts (D.A.; occasionally D.Arts or Art.D. from the Latin artium doctor) is a discipline-based terminal doctoral degree that was originally conceived and designed to be an alternative to the traditional research-based Doctor of Philosophy (Ph.D.) and the education-based Doctor of Education (Ed.D.). Like other doctorates, the D.A. is an academic degree of the highest level. The D.A. is also frequently conferred as an honorary degree with the added designation of honoris causa.

The Carnegie Foundation was the first to fund ten universities with seed money to initiate the degree.

The D.A. differs from the Ph.D. and Ed.D. degrees in its shift in emphasis from research (though a project or thesis is generally required) to the advanced study of a specific discipline, content area expertise, learning theory, and curriculum design. As such, it is often described as a "teaching doctorate". The D.A. differs from the Ed.D. in its strong disciplinary focus, while still embracing the Ed.D.'s concern for issues in education, and a theoretical as well as practical preparation in pedagogy.

National variations

Australia 
In Australia, the Doctor of Creative Arts degree is offered at several universities as a terminal degree in the field.

Europe 
In 2016, ELIA (European League of Institute of the Arts) launched The Florence Principles on the Doctorate in the Arts.  The Florence Principles, relating to the Salzburg Principles and the Salzburg Recommendations of the EUA (European University Association), define the differences between a Doctorate in the Arts compared to a scientific doctorate or Ph.D. degree. The Florence Principles have been endorsed by the European Association of Conservatoires, CILECT, the Cumulus Association, and the Society for Artistic Research.

In Finland, the Doctor of Arts degree is a research degree awarded by the University of Art and Design Helsinki, upon successful completion of studies and a dissertation in the fields of art and design.

North America
While the PhD is the most common doctoral degree in the United States, the U.S. Department of Education and the National Science Foundation recognize a number of research-oriented doctoral degrees such as the D.A. as "equivalent", and do not discriminate between them.

The idea for a Doctor of Arts degree was originally proposed at the 1932 meeting of the Association of American Universities by Wallace Atwood, then president of Clark University. However, it was not until in 1967, with support from the Carnegie Corporation of New York, that Carnegie Mellon University (formerly Carnegie Institute of Technology), began to offer the D.A. in Mathematics, History, English and Fine Arts.  The first Doctor of Arts degree in the United States was awarded in 1968, by Carnegie Mellon University, to Donald H. Taranto in the field of mathematics.  Guiding principles for the Doctor of Arts degree were established in 1970 by the Committee on Graduate Studies of the American Association of State Colleges and Universities and by the Council of Graduate Schools in the United States. Additional support was provided by the Carnegie Foundation in 1971.

The National Doctor of Arts Association (NDAA) was founded in 1991 at Idaho State University.

South America 

In Argentina, the Doctorate of Arts is offered by the National University of Córdoba and the National University of Rosario.

See also
Doctor of Fine Arts – typically an honorary degree

References

Arts, Doctor of